Stavros Theodorakis  (born 1963) is a Greek journalist and politician, who founded and led the social liberal party To Potami (The River). In the January 2015 election he was elected to the Hellenic parliament, with his party receiving 6.1%, the fourth most votes, and gaining 17 seats. In the  September 2015 election the party won only 11 seats with 4.09%.  After the party's underwhelming performance in the 2019 European Parliament Elections (1.52% and no seats), Theodorakis stepped down as President of the party.

Born in 1963 in Drapanias near Chania on the island of Crete, Theodorakis was raised in Agia Varvara, western Attica.

His career as a journalist started in 1984 at the radio stations 902 FM and Skai 100.3, as well as the newspaper Eleftherotypia. Between 1985 and 1987 he was engaged in educating Roma. He also wrote three books.

In 2000, he started the show "Protagonists" at the former public TV channel NET, and in 2006 took it to the private station Mega TV. Every Saturday he wrote a column in the newspaper Ta Nea.

On 26 February 2014, he announced his decision to quit both his show at Mega TV and his column at Ta Nea in order to launch a new party. He also promised to take a back seat on the website Protagon.gr he is also involved in. Striving to "create a new European policy to foster a broader Leftist movement", he also stated that "the survival of a country cannot depend on the kindness of its creditors".

On 14 June 2017, he underwent surgery to remove a tumour at the Metropolitan Hospital Urological Clinic, led by surgeon Vasilis Poulakis. Doctors said the surgery went well.

References

External links
 Author profile on Protagon.gr
 

1963 births
Greek columnists
Greek MPs 2015 (February–August)
Greek television journalists
Living people
People from Chania (regional unit)
The River (Greece) politicians
Greek MPs 2015–2019
The River (Greece)
Politicians from Crete